Rocky Fork is an unincorporated community in Licking County, in the U.S. state of Ohio.

History
A post office called Rocky Fork was established in 1858, and remained in operation until 1902. The community takes its name from nearby Rocky Fork.

References

Unincorporated communities in Licking County, Ohio
1858 establishments in Ohio
Populated places established in 1858
Unincorporated communities in Ohio